Bratislav Ristić (born 21 January 1980) is a current sports agent and former Serbian footballer who last played for FK Čelik Nikšić.

Career

Club career
He started his career with Club Brugge KV, and later played for FC Metalurh Donetsk, Málaga CF and FC Kuban Krasnodar.

He then had a spell with  PFC Slavia Sofia, before joining Serbian side FK Rad.

Ristić joined Chicago Fire FC of Major League Soccer in September 2010.  Ristic played in seventeen games for Chicago Fire, starting in thirteen of them. On July 25, 2011 he was released by the club.

International career
In 1998 Ristić was selected to play for the National Team of FR Yugoslavia at the under-18 level. He played 10 matches for the U-18 National Team.

Honours
Club Brugge
Belgian Cup: 2001–02
Belgian Super Cup: 2002

References

External links
 Official site
 
 

1980 births
Living people
Sportspeople from Niš
Serbian footballers
Serbian expatriate footballers
Serbia and Montenegro expatriate footballers
Serbian expatriate sportspeople in Spain
Serbian emigrants to Belgium
FK Radnički Niš players
Málaga CF players
Association football midfielders
Club Brugge KV players
FC Metalurh Donetsk players
FC Kuban Krasnodar players
PFC Slavia Sofia players
FK Rad players
Chicago Fire FC players
Belgian Pro League players
Serbian SuperLiga players
Ukrainian Premier League players
La Liga players
First Professional Football League (Bulgaria) players
Expatriate footballers in Spain
Expatriate footballers in Ukraine
Serbian expatriate sportspeople in Ukraine
Serbia and Montenegro expatriate sportspeople in Ukraine
Expatriate footballers in Russia
Expatriate footballers in Bulgaria
Expatriate soccer players in the United States
Major League Soccer players